The Honourable Robert Curzon (13 February 1774 – 14 May 1863), of Parham Park, Sussex, was a long-standing British Member of Parliament.

Curzon was the only surviving son of Assheton Curzon, 1st Viscount Curzon of Penn House, Buckinghamshire by his second wife Dorothy, daughter of Sir Robert Grosvenor, 6th Baronet. Penn Assheton Curzon was his elder half-brother and Richard Curzon-Howe, 1st Earl Howe, his nephew. He was educated at Westminster School, Lincoln's Inn and Christ Church, Oxford, where he was awarded a B.A. in 1795.

He was elected to Parliament for Clitheroe in 1796 (succeeding his cousin Richard Erle-Drax-Grosvenor), a seat he held for the next 35 years. He was also Justice of the Peace (JP), Deputy Lieutenant of Sussex and selected High Sheriff of Sussex for 1834–35.

Curzon married the Honourable Harriet Anne, eldest daughter of Cecil Bisshopp, 12th Baron Zouche of Parham, in 1808. The barony of Zouche fell into abeyance on Lord Zouche's death in 1828 but was called out of abeyance the following year in favour of Harriet Anne (who became known as the Baroness de la Zouche).
Curzon inherited Hagley Hall, Worcestershire and other unentailed properties on the death of his father in 1820 and acquired Parham Park in trust on the death of his father-in-law in 1828.

Curzon died at Parham Park in May 1863, leaving 2 sons, and was buried at Parham. Lady de la Zouche died in May 1870 and was succeeded by their elder son, Robert, who had previously succeeded his father as Member of Parliament for Clitheroe in 1831. In his will Curzon directed that the Hagley estate should be sold to provide an income for his younger son, the barrister Edward Cecil Curzon.

Curzon owned a copy of the Third Folio of Shakespeare's works, containing what may be the only copy of a Portrait of Anne Hathaway, Shakespeare's wife.

References

External links 

1774 births
1863 deaths
Younger sons of viscounts
People educated at Westminster School, London
Members of Lincoln's Inn
Alumni of Christ Church, Oxford
British MPs 1796–1800
Members of the Parliament of Great Britain for English constituencies
Members of the Parliament of the United Kingdom for English constituencies
UK MPs 1801–1802
UK MPs 1802–1806
UK MPs 1806–1807
UK MPs 1807–1812
UK MPs 1812–1818
UK MPs 1818–1820
UK MPs 1820–1826
UK MPs 1826–1830
UK MPs 1830–1831
High Sheriffs of Sussex
Deputy Lieutenants of Sussex